The 1888–89 international cricket season was from September 1888 to April 1889.

Season overview

March

England in South Africa

References

International cricket competitions by season
1888 in cricket
1889 in cricket